Shulehabad may refer to:
Shulehabad-e Olya
Shulehabad-e Sofla